Tafresh County (Ŝahrestāne Tafreŝ) is in Markazi province, Iran. The capital of the county is the city of Tafresh. At the 2006 census, the county's population was 46,680 in 14,313 households. The following census in 2011 counted 25,912 people in 8,372 households, by which time Farahan District had been separated from the county to form Farahan County. At the 2016 census, the county's population was 24,913 in 8,588 households.

Administrative divisions

The population history and structural changes of Tafresh County's administrative divisions over three consecutive censuses are shown in the following table. The latest census shows one district, four rural districts, and one city.

References

 

Counties of Markazi Province